Illinois 203 could refer to:
 Illinois Route 203, a state highway, formerly part of Illinois Route 3 and U.S. Route 66, near St. Louis

School districts
 Elwood Community Consolidated School District 203 in Will County
 Naperville Community Unit School District 203 in DuPage County
 New Trier Township High School District 203 in Cook County
 O'Fallon Township High School District 203 in St. Clair County
 Orangeville Community Unit School District 203 in Stephenson County
 Vandalia Community Unit School District 203 in Fayette County
 Westmer Community Unit School District 203 in Mercer County